Norma Kamali ( Arraez; b. June 27, 1945) is an American fashion designer. She is best known for the "sleeping bag" coat, garments made from silk parachutes, and versatile multi-use pieces.

Early life and education 
Norma Arraez was born on June 27, 1945 to Estrella C. Galib Arraez Granofsky and Salvador Mariategui William Arraez, a middle class family residing in Manhattan's Upper East Side in New York City. She aspired to be a painter. Kamali attended the Fashion Institute of Technology and earned a degree in illustration.  Upon graduating, Kamali worked as a freelance fashion illustrator for a year. She also worked for Northwest Orient Airlines from 1966 to 1967.

Designs 
In 1969, Kamali opened a boutique with her then-husband Mohammed Houssein Kamali. She became known for her line of clothing made of real silk parachute material, which included the innovation of being adjustable in length and fit by draw string. Kamali designed the red one-piece bathing suit worn by Farrah Fawcett in the iconic 1976 poster and the bathing suit worn by Whitney Houston on the back cover of her 1985 debut album. Farrah Fawcett's suit was donated to the Smithsonian National Museum of American History in 2011. She is one of several designers credited with popularizing the shoulder pad in womenswear in the 1980s and played a prominent role in adapting exaggerated shoulder pads to casual clothes at the beginning of the eighties shoulder-pad era in 1978. She reached a peak of fame during the early 1980s with her 1980 "Sweats" collection, a variety of casual garments done in sweatshirt fabric, most famously flounced, hip-yoked miniskirts called rah-rah skirts in the UK, a style she had first presented in other fabrics in 1979. Her work is included in the collections of the Metropolitan Museum of Art.

Kamali was the first designer to create an online store on eBay. In addition to designing clothing, she has also produced a fitness, health and beauty line. In 2008, Kamali produced a collection for Walmart.

Awards and honors 
In 2010 Kamali received an honorary doctorate from her alma mater, Fashion Institute of Technology.
In 1981 Kamali won a Coty Award, called the "Winnie" but formally titled the American Fashion Critics' Award.
Kamali  has a plaque on the Fashion Walk of Fame.
She received the CFDA Board of Directors Special Tribute Award in 2005, and was awarded the CFDA Geoffrey Beene Lifetime Achievement Award in 2016, which was presented to her by Michael Kors.

In 2019, Kamali received the Women's Entrepreneurship Day Pioneer Award at the United Nations in recognition for her achievements in the fashion industry.

Personal life 
In 1968, she married Mohammad 'Eddie' Kamali. They divorced in 1977. She is engaged to longtime partner, Marty Edelman. Kamali is of Lebanese and Basque descent.

References

External links 
 Norma Kamali Collection website
Photos: What Millennials Like Me Can Learn From 70-Year-Old Norma Kamali Emilia Petrarca, W Magazine, June 6, 2016

1945 births
Artists from New York City
Living people
American fashion designers
American women fashion designers
American people of Basque descent
American people of Lebanese descent
Fashion Institute of Technology alumni
21st-century American women